The Priestley-Forsyth Memorial Library, also known as the Dr. Joseph Priestley House or Cross Keys Inn, in Northumberland, Pennsylvania, was listed on the National Register of Historic Places in 1981.

It was built as an inn in 1820, and purchased in about 1880 by the theologian and scientist Joseph Priestley's great grandson Dr. Joseph Priestley.  Dr. Priestley used it as a home and medical office.  It was made into a public library about 1925.

It is located at 100 King Street in Northumberland, at the corner of Front Street (Route 11).  It is within the Northumberland Historic District, which also includes the Joseph Priestley House.

References

External links
Official site: Priestley-Forsyth Memorial Library
Original application for National Register of Historic Places: []

Hotel buildings completed in 1820
Houses on the National Register of Historic Places in Pennsylvania
Houses in Northumberland County, Pennsylvania
Libraries in Pennsylvania
National Register of Historic Places in Northumberland County, Pennsylvania